Afarinesh (Persian آفرینش lit. "Creation") is a Persian-language daily newspaper published in Iran.

Profile
Nazila Fathi of The New York Times described Afarinesh as a conservative paper in 2002. The paper has ties with the Islamic Azad University.

The managing director of the paper was convicted by the press court for "publishing false reports with the intention of disturbing the public opinion" in 2010.

See also
List of newspapers in Iran

References

Newspapers published in Iran
Persian-language newspapers
Newspapers established in 2002
2002 establishments in Iran